Nikolai Sergeyevich Belov (born August 13, 1987) is a Russian professional ice hockey defenceman who currently plays for IF Björklöven in HockeyAllsvenskan, the second highest league of ice hockey in Sweden. He has previously played in the top Russian leagues with Dynamo Moscow, Neftekhimik Nizhnekamsk, Ak Bars Kazan, SKA Saint Petersburg and Traktor Chelyabinsk.

In the 2014–15 season, Belov was traded by Neftekhimik Nizhnekamsk, along with a first-round pick, to SKA Saint Petersburg in exchange for Evgeny Ryasensky, Alexei Grishin and Mikhail Tikhonov on November 24, 2014.

On February 12, 2021, Belov was bought out from his contract at Almtuna IS by league rival IF Björklöven.

Career statistics

International

References

External links
 

1987 births
Living people
Ak Bars Kazan players
HC Dynamo Moscow players
HC Neftekhimik Nizhnekamsk players
Russian ice hockey defencemen
SKA Saint Petersburg players
Traktor Chelyabinsk players